William Francis Burman (30 August 1897 – 23 October 1974) was an English recipient of the Victoria Cross, the highest and most prestigious award for gallantry in the face of the enemy that can be awarded to British and Commonwealth forces.

Details
Burman was 20 years old, and a sergeant in the 16th Battalion, The Rifle Brigade (Prince Consort's Own), British Army during the First World War when the following deed took place for which he was awarded the VC.

During the Battle of the Menin Road Ridge on 20 September 1917 south-east of Ypres, Belgium, when the advance of his company was held up by a machine-gun at point-blank range, Sergeant Burman shouted to the men next to him to wait a few minutes and going forward to what seemed certain death killed the enemy gunner and carried the gun to the company's objective where he used it with great effect. Fifteen minutes later it was seen that about 40 of the enemy were enfilading the battalion on the right. Sergeant Burman and two others ran and got behind them, killing six and capturing two officers and 29 other ranks.

The medal
His Victoria Cross is displayed at the Imperial War Museum in London, England.

References

Monuments to Courage (David Harvey, 1999)
The Register of the Victoria Cross (This England, 1997)
VCs of the First World War: Passchendaele 1917 (Stephen Snelling, 1998)

External links
 Location of grave and VC medal (Norfolk)
 
 

1897 births
1974 deaths
People from Stepney
Rifle Brigade soldiers
British Army personnel of World War I
British World War I recipients of the Victoria Cross
British Army recipients of the Victoria Cross
Military personnel from London